FK Rudar Pljevlja, commonly known as Rudar Pljevlja or simply Rudar, is a football club based in Pljevlja, Montenegro. It currently plays in the Montenegrin First League, the country's highest tier.

Rudar have played in the First League since its inception in 2006, and won two league titles in 2009–10 and 2014–15. The club have been the strongest in the Montenegrin Cup, with three triumphs, one runner-up position and two semi-final finishes in the tournament's six seasons.

History 

Rudar (Miner) was founded in 1920 as Breznik, renaming itself Sandžak three years later. The team was aided by members of the 48th Infantry Regiment, who stationed in the town. The club was renamed again after World War II as FK Jedinstvo, but only until another renaming in 1947 in honour of chairman Velimir Jakić. That same year club reached the quarter-finals of the Yugoslav Cup where they were eliminated by top-flight FK Sarajevo 3–2 after extra time. In 1955, the club settled on their current name.

First League Record

For the first time, FK Rudar played in First League of FR Yugoslavia in season 1993–94. Below is a list of FK Rudar scores in First League by every single season.

Seasons with green background were played in the first league of Yugoslavia or Serbia and Montenegro, together with Serbian clubs.

FK Rudar in European competitions

For the first time, FK Rudar played in European competitions on season 2007–08. Until now, they played eight seasons in European cups.
Q= Qualifying

European record

Honours and achievements
Montenegrin First League – 2
winners (2): 2009–10, 2014–15
 runners-up (1): 2011–12
Montenegrin Cup – 4
winners (4): 2006–07, 2009–10, 2010–11, 2015–16
 runners-up (1): 2011–12
Second League of Serbia and Montenegro – 1
winners (2): 2000–01, 2005–06
 Montenegrin Republic League – 2
winners (2): 1957–58, 1965–66
runners-up (5): 1956–57, 1966–67, 1968–69, 1970–71, 1971–72
 Montenegrin Republic Cup – 2
winners (2): 1947–48, 2000–01

Players

Current squad

Notable players
For the list of former and current players with Wikipedia article, please see :Category:FK Rudar Pljevlja players.

Coaching staff

Historical list of coaches

 Miljan Ašanin (1947)
 Remzo Nuhanović (1948 - 1949)
 Bećir Durutlić (1950)
 Franjo Pazmanj (1953)
 Petar Purić (1954)
 Faruk Kadić (1954)
 Sveto Čubrilović (1958)
 Drago Ivanović (1959 - 1962)
 Boris Marović (1962)
 Radojica Radojičić (1964 - 1965)
 Vlatko Vujošević (1965)
 Uglješa Rakočević (1965)
 Mirko Žderić (1965 - 1966)
 Božo Dedović (1972)
 Karlo Zapušek (1976 - 1977)
 Karlo Zapušek (1982)
 Rasim Čakar (1985)
 Božidar Pajević (1987 - 1988)
 Rajko Milović (1988 - 1989)
 Hasan Ćirlija (1989 - 1991)
 Branislav Milačić (1991)
 Dragan Aničić (1992)
 Vlado Milosavljević (1992)
 Dragan Šaković (1992 - 1993)
 Mileta Milinković (1993)
 Zoran Vraneš (1993 - 1994)
 Momčilo Vujačić (1994)
 Mileta Milinković (1994)
 Danilo Vukićević (1993 - 1996)
 Boris Marović (1995)
 Mileta Milinković (1996)
 Dragan Šaković (1996 - 1997)
 Jusuf Čizmić (1997)
 Srđan Bajić (1996 – 2002)
 Rade Vesović (2002)
 Goran Milojević (2002 - 2003)
 Zoran Vraneš (2003 - 2004)
 Mirko Marić (2006 – May 2008)
 Branislav Milačić (4 May 2008 - Jun 2008)
 Ivan Adžić (Jul 2008 – Mar 2009)
 Mirko Marić (19 Mar 2009 – Apr 2009)
 Miodrag Radanović (18 Apr 2009 - Jun 2009)
 Nebojša Vignjević (Jul 2009 – Jun 2011)
 Dragan Radojičić (Jul 2011 – Jun 2012)
 Nikola Rakojević (6 Jul 2012 – Jun 2013)
 Mirko Marić (12 Jun 2013 – Mar 2016)
 Srđan Bajić (14 Mar 2016 - May 2016)
 Vuko Bogavac (16 May 2016 - 23 May 2016)
 Dragan Radojičić (23 May 2016 - Aug 2016)
 Mirko Marić (Aug 2016 - Feb 2017)
 Milan Lešnjak (Feb 2017 - May 2017)
 Radislav Dragićević (May 2017 - Sep 2018)
 Miodrag Vukotić (Sep 2017 - Jun 2018)
 Vuko Bogavac (Jul 2018 - Aug 2018)
 Edis Mulalić (Aug 2018 - Jan 2019)
 Nenad Vukčević (Feb 2019 - Jun 2019)
 Edis Mulalić (Jul 2019 - Jul 2020)
 Vuko Bogavac (Aug 2020 – Jun 2021)
 Zoran Govedarica (Jun 2021  – Nov 2021)
 Rade Petrović (Nov 2021 - Apr 2022)
 Srđan Nikić (Apr 2022 - Sep 2022 )
 Dragan Aničić (Sep 2022 )

Stadium 

Rudar plays at the Gradski stadion, a multi-use stadium including a complex of tennis, handball and basketball courts. It was built in 1948 and rebuilt in 1985. It has two stands and a current capacity of 5,140.

See also 
Montenegrin First League
Montenegrin clubs in Yugoslav football competitions (1946–2006)
 Fudbalski savez Crne Gore

References

External links 
 FK Rudar Pljevlja Official Site

 
Football clubs in Montenegro
Association football clubs established in 1920
1920 establishments in Montenegro
Football clubs in Yugoslavia